Kotha Gujjran کوٹھا گجراں is a village on Mohri Road 4 km from Kharian City Gujrat District in the Punjab province of Pakistan It is located at 32°48'06.14" N 73°49'04.19" E. Kotha Gujjran is a village owned by gujjar community: a titled clan which carry the title chaudhry (CH). It lies between Mohri Sharif, dera alam pur gondala and Mehmand Chak on Mohri Road (which connects villages to the city).

This is the village where Gujjars of the Gorsi goth originally came from. A large part of their land came under compulsory purchase by the Pakistan army after the birth of Pakistan.

A large part of the population have emigrated to European countries mainly Norway, Denmark, Sweden, and UK. Amongst its famous sons is Ch Arshad Ellahi (also known as  Ash Ellahi), a businessman in the UK and winner of 2008 ABF Tiger Awards for "Asian Business Personality of the Year," also known for his charitable work with Save the Children, NSPCC, Oxfam, Sightsavers, Muslim Hands, Islamic Relief, etc.

The closest cities to Kotha Gujjran are Kharian(4 km) Jhelum (about 20 km )  Lala Musa(about 20 km ) Dina, Pakistan  (about 40 km) and Gujrat (around 40 km).

The distance to major cities is Islamabad (around 140 km), Lahore (around 175 km), Gujranwala (around 100 km), Sialkot (around 100 km), Faisalabad (around 243 km), Multan (around 520 km), Sargodha (around 166 km),

Education
 Govt. Primary School

History
This village has been home to the Gorsi Sub-tribe of Gujjars for the past 300 years however, it is believed that the Gorsi originally lived within the forests (Pabi) and migrated out to other settlements. Kotha originally was created by three brothers Bahudur, Sikander and Sarmund whom had inherited chunks of agriculture, estimates states around 600 acres of land.

Nearby villages and towns
Kharian
Mohri Sharif
Dera Alam Pur Gondlan
Mehmand Chak
Sannat Pura

Populated places in Gujrat District

pnb:کھاریاں
pt:Kharian